Tuscarora First Nation is a Tuscarora First Nation in southern Ontario, and is a member nation of the Six Nations of the Grand River. Its reserves include Glebe Farm 40B and the Six Nations of the Grand River First Nation.

First Nations governments in Ontario
Tuscarora